Bulgaria competed at the 2004 Summer Olympics in Athens, Greece, from 13 to 29 August 2004. This was the nation's seventeenth appearance at the Summer Olympics, except for three occasions, including the 1984 Summer Olympics in Los Angeles, because of the Soviet boycott. The Bulgarian Olympic Committee sent 95 athletes, 49 men and 46 women, to compete in 19 sports. Shooting champion and four-time Olympian Mariya Grozdeva became the nation's first ever female flag bearer in the opening ceremony.

Medalists

Archery

Athletics 

Bulgarian athletes have so far achieved qualifying standards in the following athletics events (up to a maximum of 3 athletes in each event at the 'A' Standard, and 1 at the 'B' Standard).

 Key
 Note – Ranks given for track events are within the athlete's heat only
 Q = Qualified for the next round
 q = Qualified for the next round as a fastest loser or, in field events, by position without achieving the qualifying target
 NR = National record
 N/A = Round not applicable for the event
 Bye = Athlete not required to compete in round

Men
Field events

Women
Track & road events

Field events

Badminton 

Bulgaria has qualified two spots in the women's singles and doubles.

Boxing 

Bulgaria sent five boxers to Athens, winning a bronze medal to join a five-way tie for 16th place in the boxing medals scoreboard.  Their combined record was 5-5.

Canoeing

Sprint
Men

Women

Qualification Legend: Q = Qualify to final; q = Qualify to semifinal

Cycling

Road

Track
Sprint

Time trial

Equestrian

Show jumping

Gymnastics

Artistic
Bulgaria has qualified three gymnasts (two males and one female).

Men

Women

Rhythmic

Judo

Bulgaria has qualified two judoka.

Rowing

Men

Women

Qualification Legend: FA=Final A (medal); FB=Final B (non-medal); FC=Final C (non-medal); FD=Final D (non-medal); FE=Final E (non-medal); FF=Final F (non-medal); SA/B=Semifinals A/B; SC/D=Semifinals C/D; SE/F=Semifinals E/F; R=Repechage

Sailing

Men

Women

M = Medal race; OCS = On course side of the starting line; DSQ = Disqualified; DNF = Did not finish; DNS= Did not start; RDG = Redress given

Shooting 

Men

Women

Swimming 

Bulgarian swimmers earned qualifying standards in the following events (up to a maximum of 2 swimmers in each event at the A-standard time, and 1 at the B-standard time):

Men

Women

Synchronized swimming

Tennis

Volleyball

Beach

Weightlifting 

Bulgaria has qualified the following quota places.

Men

Women

Wrestling 

 Key
  – Victory by Fall.
  - Decision by Points - the loser with technical points.
  - Decision by Points - the loser without technical points.

Men's freestyle

Men's Greco-Roman

Women's freestyle

See also
 Bulgaria at the 2004 Summer Paralympics

References

External links
Official Report of the XXVIII Olympiad
Bulgarian Olympic Committee 

Nations at the 2004 Summer Olympics
2004
2004 in Bulgarian sport